Victor Razafindrakoto (born 28 February 1972) is a Malagasy long-distance runner. He competed in the men's marathon at the 1996 Summer Olympics.

References

External links
 

1972 births
Living people
Athletes (track and field) at the 1996 Summer Olympics
Malagasy male long-distance runners
Malagasy male marathon runners
Olympic athletes of Madagascar
Place of birth missing (living people)
Olympic male marathon runners